Wallingford Public Access Association, Inc. (WPAA-TV and Community Media Center) is a public access TV station in Wallingford, Connecticut. The station is a nonprofit organization. Volunteer-run, it is funded by subscriber fees that are part of Wallingford cable TV subscriber bills, as well as traditional nonprofit income sources such as grants, donations, and in-kind services.
WPAA-TV cablecast to the Wallingford on Comcast and throughout Connecticut on Frontier. There is a 24 x 7 simulcast from the website wpaa.tv for viewing world-wide. WPAA-TV can also be viewed on Roku.

WPAA-TV provides the community with resources they refer to as tools and stage to create local content for distribution as TV. The station itself does not create the content.

Connecticut utility regulators designated the station the Community Access Provider (CAP) for Wallingford. Unlike other public access stations, WPAA distributes government and educational access television, including news from Connecticut congresspeople and content made by state and federal government sources.

This Community TV is located in a two-story 1924 cow barn renovated by volunteers at 28 South Orchard Street in downtown Wallingford. The old hayloft now called studioW is where their ‘Make TV’ program happens. A mural by Ryan “ARCY” Christenson covers the full north side of the building  which is now owned by WPAA-TV.

WPAA-TV is known for being where internet celebrity Michael Buckley got his start, producing the earliest version of his show What the Buck.

In addition to being a television studio, WPAA-TV is a media space with an art gallery, community rooms, video editing, and podcast suites available for community use. The nonprofit also hosts local theater and filmmaking initiatives. The gallery permanent collection StreetshotZ, features photographs by local portrait photographer Charles Buzinsky.

Proceeds from gallery events supports local food and housing insecure programs in the area. WPAA-TV welcomed visitors to bring nonperishable food when they visit the gallery. As part of a StreetshotZ Photobook give-a-way volunteers panhandle for donations. This project and promotion video was recognized as first place Community Impact winner by the national Alliance for Community Media in 2020.

WPAA-TV is also noted for Alliance for Community Media Best in the USA small stations awards of 2019 and two consecutive years, best in New England 2013 and 2014, awarded by Alliance for Community Media North East. Some of the station's producers including Georgian Lussier have won some prestigious honors such as Rika Welsh Community Impact Award

References 

Wallingford, Connecticut
American public access television